Robert W. Churchill (born April 10, 1947) is a former American politician and lawyer.

Born in Waukegan, Illinois, Churchill received his bachelor's degree in history and political science from Northwestern University and his Juris Doctor degree from University of Iowa College of Law. He practiced law at Grayslake Law Firm in Grayslake, Illinois, since 1972, and lived in Lake Villa, Illinois. Churchill was involved with the Republican Party.  In the 1982 general election, Churchill defeated Robert Gesiakowski of Antioch. Churchill served in the Illinois House of Representatives from 1983 to 1999 and from 2003 to 2007. After the Republicans took control of the House during the Republican Revolution, Churchill was named Majority Leader by Speaker Lee A. Daniels. In 1998, Churchill ran for the Republican nomination for Illinois Secretary of State, ultimately losing to former state legislator Al Salvi.

After the 2001 decennial redistricting process, Churchill successfully ran for the Illinois House of Representatives from the 62nd district. Churchill continued in the Illinois House until a failed bid for the Republican nomination to face Democratic incumbent Melissa Bean in Illinois's 8th congressional district. Churchill lost the primary to David McSweeney.

Notes

1947 births
Living people
People from Waukegan, Illinois
People from Lake Villa, Illinois
Northwestern University alumni
University of Iowa alumni
Illinois lawyers
Republican Party members of the Illinois House of Representatives